Alfred Oko Vanderpuije (born 4 November 1955) is a Ghanaian educationist and politician who currently serves as a member of parliament. He is currently the member of parliament for Ablekuma South Constituency in the Greater Accra Region of Ghana.

His Dutch surname reflects his Euro-African descent. The ancestors of Vanderpuije originally came from Sint-Maartensdijk on the former island of Tholen in the Netherlands. His ancestor, Jacobus van der Puije was Governor of the Dutch Gold Coast in 1780.

Early life 
A Jamestown native, he was born and bred at Mamprobi, Darkuman and Dansoman at various stages of his childhood.

Education 
Vanderpuije studied at Accra Teacher Training College for a 3-year Post Secondary in Education. He holds a Masters in Education from Mid America Nazarene College and a Specialist in Education Administration from the University of Missouri Kansas City, U.S.A.

Political career

As Mayor of Accra 
He was the former Mayor of Accra, installed in that office by President John Atta Mills in 2009 and he was maintained in that office by President John Dramani Mahama, completing his second term in 2017.

As Member of Parliament 
Vanderpuije was elected to the Parliament of Ghana in the 2016 elections on the ticket of the National Democratic Congress (NDC) to represent the Ablekuma South Constituency in the Greater Accra Region for a four-year term. He won the elections with 31,927 votes out of the 59,041 valid votes cast  representing 54.36% of the votes.  As an MP, he is a member of Foreign Affairs Committee and House Committee of Parliament.

Personal life 
Vanderpuije lost his wife Gifty Naa Adei Vanderpuije in 2012, when she died at Korle-Bu Teaching Hospital. In 2019, Vanderpuije got remarried to Cynthia Amerley Ayiku after seven years of losing his wife.

Legacy 
On the night of Thursday 9 September 2021, he directed traffic on the Sakaman Junction to the Dansoman roundabout stretch. He decided to direct traffic when the police were absent. His actions brought relief to users using that road.

References

1955 births
Living people
Ga-Adangbe people
Ghanaian people of Dutch descent
People from Accra
Mayors of Accra
Vanderpuije family of Ghana
Ghanaian Seventh-day Adventists
Ghanaian MPs 2017–2021
National Democratic Congress (Ghana) politicians
Ghanaian MPs 2021–2025